Lice Two: Still Buggin' is the second EP released by American rappers Aesop Rock and Homeboy Sandman. It was published by Rhymesayers Entertainment on September 29, 2016. The EP's cover art was created by Jeremy Fish, who designed the cover art for the duo's previous EP Lice.

Track listing

References 

2016 EPs
Aesop Rock albums
Homeboy Sandman albums